is a Japanese record label.

The Giza Studio started as an indie label in the late 1990s under the name Garage Indies Zapping Association, but soon Being Inc. bought it as their sister label company. Giza Studio is located in Osaka, Japan and has been producing successful artists such as Mai Kuraki, Garnet Crow, Rina Aiuchi, etc. since their commercial service on September 1, 1998. Along with other Being Group's sister labels (Zain Records, Rooms Records, B-Gram Records, BMFC, Vermillion Records and Northern Music), the studio's main task is to create music productivity by hiring talented artists, composers and engineers. The label's creative design (such as CD-jacket, photography and cinematography) is handled by Mod's House, while J-Disc is in charge of all the distribution and promotion of the sales.

Giza's artists have provided numerous opening and ending themes for Anime television series such as Meitantei Conan, Project ARMS, MÄR and Tantei Gakuen Q.

Sub-labels
Giza Studio (GZCA) 1999-
Tent House (TCR) 1999-
Garage Indies Zapping Association (ICR) 1999-2000
WEEDS (WRC) 1999
O-Town Jazz (formerly known as Giza Jazz; GZCA) 1999-
Giza USA (GZUC) 2000-2001
Styling Records (GZCS) 2002-2006
UNDOWN (UCR) 2003
Blue-Z (GZCB) 2004
D-Go (GZDC) 2012-
Crimzon (CCR) 2014- 
Rozetta (RCR) 2014

Active artists

Giza Studio

Chicago Poodle
Doa
d-project
Marie Ueda (植田真梨恵)
dps
Sard Underground

D-GO

Sensation
Wands

Crimson
Amai Bouryoku (甘い暴力)
Shintenchi Kaibyaku Shudan-Zigzag- (-真天地開闢集団-ジグザグ)

Giza Jazz / O-town Jazz 

Aoki Hikari (青紀ひかり)
Natsuki Morikawa (森川七月)
Yuki Okazaki (岡崎雪)

Former artists

 Grass Arcade (1998–1999)
 4D-JAM (1998–2001)
 New Cinema Tokage  (1998–2002)
 Sweet Velvet (1999–2001)
 Jason Zodiac (1999–2002)
 Rumania Montevideo (1999–2002)
  (1999–2006)
 WAG (1999–2006)
  (1999–2007)
  (2000–2002)
 Nothin' but love  (2000–2002)
 Soul Crusaders  (2000–2002)
 Ramjet Pulley (2000–2003)
  (2000–2010)
 Garnet Crow (2000–2013)
 Les Mauvais Garçonnes (2001–2002)
  (2001–2002)
  (2001–2003)
  (2001–2004)
 The★tambourines (2001–2009)
  (2001–2010)
  (2002–2006)
  (2002–2007)

 U-ka Saegusa in dB (2002–2010)
  (2002–2011)
  (2003–2008)
  (2003–2008)
  (2003–2009)
 OOM (2005–2009)
  (2005–2008)
  (2005–2012)
  (2006–2009)
  (2006-2010)
  (2007–2009)
  (2007–2010)
 Naifu (2007–2009)
 Gulliver Get (2007–2011)
  (2008–2009)
 PINC INC (2008–2009)
  (2008–2012)
 Caos Caos Caos (2008-2018)
  (2009–2010)
 Grram (2010–2015)
 Natsuiro (2012-2016)
 WAR ED (2014–2015)

Composers and arrangers
Aika Ohno
Akihito Tokunaga
Hiroshi Asai
Yoshinobu Ohga
Hirohito Furui
Hitoshi Okamoto
Makoto Miyoshi
Kūron Oshiro
Yuuichirou Iwai
Kenji Gotou
Satoru Kobayashi

Compilation albums

See also
 Being Inc.
 List of record labels

References

External links
 Giza studio website 
 Giza USA website
 

Japanese record labels
Pop record labels